The Artamonov Business  is a 1941  Soviet drama film directed by Grigori Roshal based on the eponymous novel by Maxim Gorky.

Plot 
Fabricant Ilya Artamonov from the former serfs. His desire to strengthen and develop the business knows no obstacles. He is still connected with peasants and craftsmen, but with his death this connection breaks off.  His son, Pyotr Artamonov, begins to conflict with the workers, to which the successor of Artamonov's case passes   Ilya Artamonov jr.

Cast
 Sergei Romodanov as Ilya Artamonov 
 Tamara Chistyakova as Ulyana Baymakova  
 Mikhail Derzhavin Sr. as Pyotr Artamonov 
 Vera Maretskaya as Natalya  
 Vladimir Balashov as Nikita  
  as Aleksei
 Mikhail Pugovkin as Stepasha Barsky
 Grigory Shpigel as Yakov
 Lyubov Orlova as Paula Menotti
 Tatyana Barysheva as Barskaya
 Nadir Malishevsky as  Ilya Jr.

References

External links 
  

1941 films
Soviet drama films
1941 drama films
Mosfilm films
Soviet black-and-white films
Films based on works by Maxim Gorky
1940s Russian-language films